Collin Burns is a speedcuber from the United States who formerly held the world record for solving the Rubik’s cube in 5.25 seconds.

Biography
On April 25, 2015 he set the world record for the fastest 3x3x3 Rubik's Cube single solve with a time of 5.25. He set that time (which was the world record for approximately eight months) using the YuXin brand 3x3 cube. Burns solved the cube 0.3 seconds faster than the previous world record of 5.55 seconds, set by Mats Valk. His record was broken by Lucas Etter on November 21, 2015.

Burns had his 5.25 solve recorded at a Rubik's Cube competition at Central Bucks West High School in Doylestown, Pennsylvania. He was described as a "teenager" in reports of the event. In 2014, Burns set a North American continental record of 5.93 seconds for solving the 3x3x3 cube, and he beat world champion at the time, Feliks Zemdegs in the US Nationals 2014 speedcubing competition.

Collin is now a researcher in the field of AI alignment.

References

Living people
Year of birth missing (living people)
Place of birth missing (living people)
American speedcubers